The 2011 NSW Premier League season was the 11th season of the revamped NSW Premier League.

Teams 
West Sydney Berries were relegated at the end of the 2010 season after finishing at the bottom of the table. They were replaced by Super League champions Parramatta Eagles.

 South Coast Wolves home ground of WIN Stadium is under renovation, and will use John Crehan Park until it is finished.
 Sydney Olympics home ground of Belmore Oval is under renovation, and will use Lambert Park until it is finished.

League table

Fixtures

Week 1

Week 2

Week 3

Week 4

† Bonnyrigg v Sydney United (originally scheduled for Saturday, 16 April) was washed out due to heavy rain and postponed to a later date.

† Rockdale v Marconi (originally scheduled for Saturday, 16 April) was washed out due to heavy rain and postponed to Wednesday 4 May.

Week 5

Week 6

† Parramatta v Manly (originally scheduled for Sunday, 1 May) was washed out due to heavy rain. and postponed to Wednesday 18 May

Week 7

Week 8

Week 9

Week 10

Week 11

† Due to South Coast's home ground John Crehan Park being washed out due to inclement weather, an agreement between South Coast and Sutherland Sharks allowed the game to be played at Sutherland's home ground of Seymour Shaw Park, with South Coast being allotted the home team.

Week 12

† APIA Leichhardt Tigers v Rockdale City Suns, along with Manly United v Sydney United matches, both scheduled for Sunday, 12 June 2011 were postponed due to inclement weather. The APIA v Rockdale game, was rescheduled for 9 July 2011. The Manly v Sydney United game was played on Wednesday, 27 July 2011.

Week 13

†Parramatta Eagles v South Coast, scheduled for Saturday, 18 June, was postponed due to inclement weather. The game was rescheduled for Wednesday, 3 August.

Week 14

Week 15

Week 16

Week 17

† Round 17 was originally scheduled to be played on the weekend of 23/24 July 2011, but all matches were washed out due to the extreme weather conditions and rescheduled for 4 September 2011

Week 18

Week 19

Week 20

Week 21

Week 22

Finals
At the end of the regular season, the top 5 teams play off in a finals series to determine the champion for the season. The finals format used is the final five system used in other sports throughout Australia. This system gives the 1st place getter the first week off and allows the top 3 teams a "2nd chance" to make the grand final.

Leading Goal Scorers
Correct as of Round 16

† Alex Smith left Sydney Olympic, and the NSW Premier League to join Gold Coast United in the A-League.

References

External links
NSW Premier League Official Website
2011 NSW Premier League Draw & Results

2011 in Australian soccer
2011 domestic association football leagues
2011